Adragon De Mello (born October 5, 1976) graduated from the University of California, Santa Cruz with a degree in computational mathematics in 1988, at age 11. At the time, he was the youngest college graduate in U.S. history, a record broken in 1994 by Michael Kearney.

Education
Adragon was the only child of Cathy Gunn and Agustin Eastwood De Mello (1929–2003).  His father had set the goal that his son would become a Nobel Prize laureate by age 16, and he obsessively pushed his son in mathematics and other academic subjects from an early age. For example, when doing math homework, his father insisted that he solve an equation five times, even when he got the correct answer on the first attempt.

In 1981, Adragon was accepted into Mensa.  He has also been a member of Intertel, another organization for people with high intelligence. Based on his father's estimate when his son was five years old, Adragon has a projected IQ of 400.

After attending a series of schools for gifted children, Adragon attended Cabrillo College for two years starting in 1984.  After that, he transferred to UC–Santa Cruz.  In 1987, while at university, Adragon and his father were interviewed by Morley Safer on 60 Minutes II. They also appeared on 48 Hours (TV series) and The Tonight Show.  While he did graduate from university in 1988, some of his math teachers later claimed that his grades were borderline.

After graduating from university and being legally removed from his father's custody, he opted to enroll in Sunnyvale Junior High School (now Sunnyvale Middle School) under the assumed name of James Gunn – James after the fictional spy, James Bond, with his mother's last name.  He took all of the classes except math, and played in Little League Baseball.  He found it "nice because no one knew who [he] was" and was "upset" when local papers identified him after his graduation. Being outed as a math genius led to social problems.  In 1994, he graduated from Homestead High School.

Adragon was accepted into a graduate program at the Florida Institute of Technology.

Family 
The elder De Mello was a karate master, flamenco guitarist, and former weightlifting champion.  He was obsessed with his son's academic achievements and was prone to "scary" fits of anger.  Sometimes, if his partner or his son did not comply with his demands, the father threatened suicide.

In July 1988, the parents separated, and their son was eventually placed in the custody of his mother, Cathy Gunn.  His mother alleged psychological abuse from the elder De Mello, saying that he pushed their son too hard and did not permit her to use the telephone or to be present during interviews.

On March 15, 2001, the elder De Mello ended up in an armed standoff with Santa Cruz police and was charged of assault with a deadly weapon.  The elder De Mello, who had bladder cancer, was released to the custody of his son.  The father died on May 30, 2003.

Career 
In 2000, De Mello was training to be an estimator for a commercial painting company.

See also
Child prodigy

References

External links
Adragon De Mello articles at Los Angeles Times

1976 births
Living people
University of California, Santa Cruz alumni
Mensans